Adolph Putnam "Ziggy" Hamblin (1896 – August 17, 1966) was an American football, basketball, and baseball player and coach.

A native of Galesburg, Illinois, Hamblin attended Knox College in that city. He received 16 varsity letters at Knox, competing in football, basketball, baseball, and track.

He served as the head football coach at West Virginia State College from 1921 to 1944. He led the 1936 West Virginia State Yellow Jackets football team to the black college football national championship. He also coached the basketball and baseball teams and was a professor of biology for 45 years.

In 1987, Hamblin was posthumously inducted into the Knox-Lombard Athletic Hall of Fame. In addition, the science building at West Virginia State was named for him.

References

External links
 

1896 births
1966 deaths
American men's basketball players
Knox Prairie Fire baseball coaches
Knox Prairie Fire baseball players
Knox Prairie Fire football players
Knox Prairie Fire men's basketball players
West Virginia State Yellow Jackets baseball coaches
West Virginia State Yellow Jackets football coaches
West Virginia State Yellow Jackets men's basketball coaches
People from Galesburg, Illinois
Players of American football from Illinois
Baseball players from Illinois
Basketball players from Illinois
Track and field athletes from Illinois
African-American coaches of American football
African-American players of American football
African-American baseball coaches
African-American baseball players
African-American basketball coaches
African-American basketball players
African-American track and field athletes
20th-century African-American sportspeople